The Aranca or Zlatica (Romanian: Aranca, Serbian: Златица / Zlatica, Hungarian: Aranka) is a 117 km long river in the Banat region of Romania and Serbia, left tributary of the river Tisa.

Hydronymy

The Serbian and Hungarian names of the river carry the meaning the golden river.

Course
The Aranca originates in the northern part of the Banat, near the village Sânpetru German, southwest of the city of Arad, Romania. It flows to the west, next to the large villages of Sânpetru Mare, Saravale, the town of Sânnicolau Mare, Dudeștii Vechi and Vălcani, where it leaves Romania after the course of 76 km and enters Serbia as the Zlatica for the remaining 41 km.

In Serbia, the river turns southwest, receives from the right the Kikinda canal which connects it to the Canal Danube-Tisa-Danube to the south, flows next to the village of Padej and empties into the Tisa river at the town of Ada. Near the village of Banatski Monoštor the Zlatica receives from the right its main tributary, another Romanian-Serbian river, the Begej (not to be confused with larger Begej that flows into the Tisa).

Characteristics
The Aranca belongs to the Danube drainage basin, itself draining 1,470 km² (790 km² in Romania, 680 km² in Serbia). In the lower part it has been channelized, so its navigable for the last 10 km and also very important for the irrigation of the arable land in its valley. Near the village of Jazovo, waters of the Zlatica are used for the Ostojićevo fish pond, and a natural Celeruša bog is also located there.

Settlements located near the river

Romania
 Secusigiu
 Periam
 Sânpetru Mare
 Saravale
 Sânnicolau Mare
 Dudeștii Vechi
 Vălcani

Serbia
 Crna Bara
 Banatski Monoštor
 Jazovo
 Padej

References 

 Mala Prosvetina Enciklopedija, Third edition (1985); Prosveta; 
 Jovan Đ. Marković (1990): Enciklopedijski geografski leksikon Jugoslavije; Svjetlost-Sarajevo; 
 Srpska porodična enciklopedija, Vol. X (2007); Narodna knjiga and Politika NM; 

Rivers of Romania
Rivers of Serbia
Geography of Vojvodina
Rivers of Timiș County
Rivers of Arad County
Banat